Luis Eduardo Chataing Zambrano (born April 8, 1967 in Caracas) is an announcer, actor, television presenter, and comedian.  He is known for the show Stand Up Comedy.

Personal life 
His father was the architect Alejandro Chataing Roncajolo, a member of a large family of architects who have shaped Venezuelan architecture, and Gisela Zambrano Perdomo. Grandson of the architect Luis Eduardo Chataing (designer of the country's hospital network, Liceo Andres Bello, Military Hospital, Hospital Oncológico,  School of Nursing and Customs of La Guaira), who was the son of another then-famous architect, Alejandro Chataing Poleo (Nuevo Circo in Caracas,  Military History Museum, Arch of Carabobo, Academy of Fine Arts, Caracas Municipal Council).

Filmography

References

External links 
  
 Entrevista a Chataing. Por Karina Braun

1967 births
Living people
Venezuelan television presenters
Venezuelan male television actors